Edwin R. Pacheco (born 1981) is a former Democratic member of the Rhode Island House of Representatives, representing the 47th District since 2005. During his tenure sessions, he served on the House Committees on Corporations, Municipal Government, Oversight and Separation of Powers. In May 2010, Pacheco was elected as Chairman of the Democratic Party in Rhode Island.

Pacheco declared his candidacy for the 2014 election for Secretary of State of Rhode Island in April 2013, but he withdrew from the race in October 2013 and endorsed Guillaume de Ramel. Nellie Gorbea defeated de Ramel in the Democratic Party primary election, and won the general election.

References

External links
Rhode Island Democratic Party Official site
Rhode Island House - Representative Edwin Pacheco Official RI House website

1981 births
Hispanic and Latino American state legislators in Rhode Island
Living people
Democratic Party members of the Rhode Island House of Representatives
People from Burrillville, Rhode Island
University of Rhode Island alumni